The Civil War book series chronicles in great detail the American Civil War. Published by Time Life the series was simultaneously released in the US and Canada between 1983 and 1987, with subsequent identical reprints in the late 1980s - early 1990s following suit for foreign, though untranslated, dissemination as well. Some titles focused on a specific topic, such as the blockade, and spies, but most volumes concentrated on the battles and campaigns, presented in chronological order.

Each volume in the series was 176 pages in length, heavily illustrated and with pictorial essays on specific topics within each volume and came standard without a dust jacket. Executed in hardcover, each volume was bound in silvery-gray padded faux leather, the cover endowed with in deep blue printed text imprints, and heavily embossed with Civil War symbology with an oval shaped illustration glued on.

There are 28 volumes in the series:

Because of it being a USA-specific topic, no international editions of the main series and/or the hereafter mentioned spin-offs are known to have been published by either Time Life itself or licensed others. Still, interested parties in other language territories were offered the opportunity to acquire the original American version via mail through their nearest Time Life Books subsidiary, as was commonplace for the company at the time, typically by taking out a series subscription.

Slipcases 
While the series was being released for the first time, the publisher had enabled its subscribers to separately order in gold imprinted hardboard slipcases, executed in blue and able to hold three volumes.
The publisher repeated this for its 1999 reprint run, but this time as gray, embossed hardcover slipcases, able to hold two volumes.
These slipcases are relatively rare.

Excerpt 
A 432-page excerpt hardcover variant edition, its chapter organization roughly following the series title order as released, was concurrently published in 1990 by educational publisher Prentice Hall as "Brother against brother, Time-Life Books history of the Civil War", as well as by Time-Life itself in a dust jacket for the general populace under the same title, and was subsequently reprinted as "The Time-Life history of the Civil War" by Barnes & Noble Books in 1995. Renowned Civil War historian James M. McPherson (who had not contributed to the main series) provided the foreword for the excerpt edition.

Spin-offs 
A well-received series at the time, it has enticed Time-Life to delve much deeper into the subject of the American Civil War with follow-up releases as companion series, it in the process arguably becoming Time-Life's  most revisited topic. These included, Collector's Library of the Civil War (1981-1985, 28 volumes – reprinted by Easton Press in 1998 with two additional titles – , deluxe reproductions of memoirs written by Civil War participants, actually already started before the main series and therefore conceivably the de facto source publication), Echoes of Glory (1991, 3 volume box set, two volumes detailing the arms and equipment of both respective armies, the third one being an historical atlas of the war, re-using the maps the publisher had originally commissioned for the main series,  – reprinted several times in the 1990s in varying executions, including a 1999 boxed softcover edition), and Voices of the Civil War (1996-1998, 18 illustrated volumes, reproductions of letters from Civil War participants, written at the time of the key battles around which the series was organized). Aside from these, Time-Life (re)issued The Civil War: A Narrative – 40th Anniversary Edition in 1999-2000, an illustrated commemorative version of Shelby Foote's magus opus (14 volumes – the original three-volume work was, save for a few maps, not illustrated). Additionally, two stand-alone titles were released as a, summarizing, general history of the war, and, like Voices and A Narrative, again making use of the considerable pictorial archive the publisher had accumulated for the main series, including their own commissioned maps. The first one concerned "War between Brothers", released in 1996 as part of the six-volume mini-series The American Story, that dealt with selected highlights of US history, and which was followed in 2000 by "An Illustrated History of the Civil War", a truly stand-alone title as that title was not a part of a series.

Nor have the "War between Brothers" and "Illustrated History" remained the only stand-alone Civil War titles by Time-Life; despite the fact that the publisher had largely withdrawn from book publication in 2003, subsequent iterations of the company did release additional Civil War book titles – aside from re-issuing the Illustrated History title in 2011 – , mostly on the occasion of the 150th anniversary of the war, being in essence largely rehashings of the considerable editorial effort they had undertaken for the main series thirty years earlier. Titles thus released included,
 "1863, Turning Point of the Civil War: Chancellorsville/Gettysburg/Vicksburg/Chickamauga/Chattanooga" (1998,  and reproducing McPherson's aforementioned foreword)
 "Gettysburg" (2013)
 "The Civil War in 500 Photographs" (2015)
 "The Civil War; Generals in the Field" (2015, 96-page single magazine theme issue)
 "On the Front Lines: From Fort Sumter to Appomattox" (2016)

Apart from the book titles, Time-Life has under its own imprint released in 1991 the PBS multi-award-winning 1989-1990 documentary series The Civil War by documentary maker Ken Burns (who in turn was inspired by Shelby Foote's work) as a 9-tape VHS box set, while also re-releasing the series as a 5-disc DVD collection in 2009 on DVD, again re-issuing the collection in 2015 with an additional disc. Voices of the Civil War was also released as a taped audio book series by Time-Life (for which the publisher had commissioned Hachette Audio), shortly after the release of the book versions. In 1991 the company also released "The Civil War Music: Collector's Edition" three-piece box set, a rendition of contemporary tunes played at the times, in both music cassette and CD formats. The accompanying 24-page booklet featured information lifted from the main series, predominantly from the volume Tenting Tonight.

An ancient, precursory publication on the topic had been the centennial 1961 six-part The Civil War article series for Life Magazine, commemorating the centennial anniversary, from which the book "Great Battles of the Civil War" was derived in the same year.

History books about the American Civil War
Series of history books
Time Life book series
Book series introduced in 1983